Songs of Courage is an album by saxophonist James Spaulding which was recorded in 1991 and released on the Muse label.

Reception

The AllMusic review by Greg Turner stated "This is a fine recording by an underrecognized saxophone master".

Track listing
All compositions by James Spaulding except where noted
 "Cabu" (Roland Alexander) – 7:10
 "Minor Bertha" (Elmo Hope) – 5:51
 "Judy" (Alexander) – 5:49
 "Autumn Leaves" (Joseph Kosma, Johnny Mercer, Jacques Prévert) – 6:54	
 "Wee" (Denzil Best) – 4:58
 "Black Market" (Tyrone Jefferson) – 6:24
 "Uhuru Sasa" – 4:29
 "Song of Courage" – 6:12
 "King" (Roland Alexander, Andrew Jenkins) – 8:05

Personnel
James Spaulding – alto saxophone, flute
Roland Alexander – tenor saxophone (tracks 1, 2, 6 & 8)
Tyrone Jefferson – trombone (tracks 1, 6 & 8)
Kenny Barron – piano 
Ray Drummond – bass 
Louis Hayes – drums

References

Muse Records albums
James Spaulding albums
1993 albums
Albums recorded at Van Gelder Studio